Regionalzug, abbreviated as R, is a type of local passenger train in Austria. It is similar to the Regionalbahn (RB) and Regio (R) train categories in neighboring Germany and Switzerland, respectively. In general, a Regionalzug service will make all station stops, as opposed to trains such as the Regional-Express (REX).

Passenger rail transport in Austria